"You Won't Find Another Fool Like Me" is a 1973 single by British pop group The New Seekers. Written by Tony Macaulay and Geoff Stephens, arranged by Gerry Shury and produced by Tommy Oliver.

Featuring lead vocals by member Lyn Paul (the first time she had sung lead on a single), the song became the group's biggest hit for two years as it remained in the top five over Christmas 1973. "You Won't Find Another Fool Like Me" went on to be the band's second and final number-one single in the UK Singles Chart, spending a single week at the top of the chart in January 1974. The song was included on the group's final album as an active band, Together, as they announced their decision to split a month later.

Charts

Weekly charts

Year-end charts

References

1973 singles
UK Singles Chart number-one singles
Irish Singles Chart number-one singles
Songs written by Tony Macaulay
Songs written by Geoff Stephens
1973 songs
Polydor Records singles
The New Seekers songs